Don Diego de León y Navarrete (1807 in Córdoba – October 15, 1841 in Madrid)  was a Spanish military figure.  As a young man, he entered the Spanish army as a cavalryman and achieved the rank of captain at the age of 17.

He fought in the southern front during the First Carlist War on the side of the Liberals (Christinos), and made himself famous for marching at the head of his lancers and riding at the spot where the enemy was most numerous.  At Arcos de la Frontera, in charge of a squadron of 70 horsemen, he managed to detain a Carlist column until Liberal reinforcements arrived.  He was awarded the Cross of Saint Ferdinand as a result (Cruz Laureada de San Fernando).

On the northern front, he fought at the Battle of Mendigorría and later captured Belascoáin from the Carlists in 1838, thereby earning his noble title.

In 1840, he was named Captain-General of New Castile.

He was a member of the Moderate Party (Partido Moderado), and with the fall of the regent María Cristina de Borbón during the reign of Isabel II, he went into exile in France.  Later, in 1841, he joined O'Donnell's revolt against Baldomero Espartero.  Diego de León was arrested and later executed by firing squad.

External links

1807 births
1841 deaths
People from Córdoba, Spain
Military personnel of the First Carlist War
Executed Spanish people
People executed by Spain by firing squad
Laureate Cross of Saint Ferdinand